The 2016 USL Premier Development League season was the 22nd season of the PDL. The regular season began on May 6 and ended on July 17. The Michigan Bucks were the season champions.

Conferences

Changes From 2015

New/Returning teams

Name Changes 
Golden State Misioneros became LA Laguna FC.
Springfield Synergy became Saint Louis FC U23.

Folding/Moving
Forest City London – moved to League1 Ontario
Houston Dutch Lions – moved to National Premier Soccer League
Puget Sound Gunners FC – Folded
Boston Rams – Folded
Real Colorado Foxes – Folded
D.C. United U-23 – Folded its PDL team
Orlando City U-23 – Folded its PDL team
Ocala Stampede – Folded

On Hiatus
Laredo Heat

Standings

Tiebreakers
1.  Head-to-head results
2.  Goal differential
3.  Goals scored

Eastern Conference

Northeast Division

Mid Atlantic Division

South Atlantic Division

Central Conference

Great Lakes Division

Heartland Division

Southern Conference

Southeast Division

Mid South Division

Western Conference

Northwest Division

Central Pacific Division

Southwest Division

Playoffs

 After extra time

Conference Championships

The PDL Conference Championships were held on the weekend of July 22–24, with the four conference champions advancing to the PDL Semifinals.

PDL Championship

The PDL Championship semi-finals are to be held on the week of July 24–31. The 2016 PDL Championship Game will be held on the weekend of August 5–7.

Awards
 Most Valuable Player: Chevaughn Walsh (OCN)
 Young (U21) Player of the Year: Sven König (KWU)
 Coach of the Year:  Demir Muftari, (MIB)
 Defender of the Year: Alhassan Abubakar (MIB)
 Goalkeeper of the Year: Ryan Cretens (CAR)
 Creative Player of the Year: Adam Najem (MIB)

All-League and All-Conference Teams

Eastern Conference
F: Nathan Regis (OCN), Santi Moar (CHE), Chevaughn Walsh (OCN) *
M: Arun Basuljevic (NYR) *, Marco Micaletto (CHE), Paul Marie (REA)
D: Cameron Botes (CHE), Juan Sanchez (CHE), Marquez Fernandez (BAL) *, Peyton Ericson (TRM)
G: Ryan Cretens (CAR) *

Central Conference
F: Sven König (KWU),  Sullivan Silva (TBC), Russell Cicerone (MIB)
M: Aleksi Pahkasalo (DRC), Anthony Putrus (TBC), Sergio Camargo (KWU)
D: Alhassan Abubakar (MIB) *, Tom Owens (MIB) *, Austin Ledbetter (DMM), Moustapha Fofana (DRC)
G: Nico Campbell (DMM)

Western Conference
F: Mark Verso (GSF), Christian Chaney (FRE) *, Dominic Russo (CGY) *
M: Michael Turner (TUC), Erik Holt (SDZ), Jose Hernandez (GSF)
D: Josh Smith (BUR), Niko de Vera (POR), Gordon Hall (TUC), Nathan Aune (WAS)
G: Augustin Rey (FRE)

Southern Conference
F: Carlos Araujo (VIL), Bruno Henrique (MIO), Mohamed Kourouma (MIA)
M: Tosan Popo (SWF), Lucas Coutinho (SFS) *, Noah Keats (OKC) *
D: Kimathi Kaumbutho (SWF), Fernando Machado (MIO), Sebastian Pineda (OKC), Josh Taylor (OKC) *
G: Paulo Pita (VIL)

* denotes All-League player

Attendance
Teams with an average home attendance of at least 1,000:

References

USL League Two seasons